The Chalisgaon–Dhule line is a railway route in Maharashtra, India.

History
The Chalisgaon–Dhule line was opened in 1900, serving between Chalisgaon and Dhule in Jalgaon and Dhule district in the Indian state of Maharashtra. The line includes a single-line system, with traction of diesel.

Electrification
The  to Dhule terminus track electrification is completed.

Routing
The 51111/51112 Chalisgaon–Dhule Passenger runs via Bhoras Budruk, Jamda, Rajmane, Mordad Tanda, Shirud, Mohadi Pargane Laling, Dhule terminus.

Trains

References

External links
Indian Railway Map 
 Ministry of Indian Railways, Official website
Book Indian Railway Tickets
Train Running Status
Indian Railway Map, Official website 

Rail transport in Maharashtra
5 ft 6 in gauge railways in India
Railway lines opened in 1900
Dhule district